Paul Brandeis Raushenbush (born 24 June 1964) is a US writer, editor, and religious activist. 

He currently serves as President and CEO of Interfaith Alliance and formerly served as Senior Advisor for Public Affairs and Innovation at Interfaith America (formerly the Interfaith Youth Core). He was Senior Vice President and editor of Voices at Auburn Seminary.  From 2009 to 2015 he was the Executive Editor Of Global Spirituality and Religion for Huffington Post's Religion section, and formerly served as editor of BeliefNet. From 2003–2011, Raushenbush served as Associate Dean of Religious Life and the Chapel at Princeton University, and served as President of the Association Of College and University Religious Affairs (ACURA) from 2009 to 2011. Raushenbush is the co-founder with Wolfgang F. Danspeckgruber of PORDIR, The Program of Religion, Diplomacy, and International Relations at the Liechtenstein Institute on Self-Determination at Princeton University.

An ordained Baptist minister in the American Baptist tradition, Raushenbush is the great-grandson of 19th-century Baptist cleric and Social Gospel proponent Walter Rauschenbusch (name spelled differently).

He is a graduate of Macalester College and Union Theological Seminary in New York.  He is married to the author Brad Gooch, and they have two children.

Organizations 
On July 22, 2022, it was announced that Raushenbush would become the new president and CEO of The Interfaith Alliance, replacing the former Rabbi Jack Moline.

Political views 
In 2022, Paul Raushenbush was asked the question: "Is separation of church and state going to be a big issue for the Interfaith Alliance?" Rev. Paul Raushenbush replied:"Absolutely. The origin of church and state is to protect religion from over-encroachment by the state. Public schools should be places where people can come as they are. That includes nonreligious people, whether secular humanists or atheists. I’m not interested in erasure. I want to draw the line at making religion positive and non-coercive."

Bibliography
 Teen Spirit: One World, Many Faiths (2004)
 editor of Christianity and the Social Crisis - in the 21st century

References

Living people
Baptist ministers from the United States
HuffPost writers and columnists
American Christian writers
American people of German descent
American people of Jewish descent
American male non-fiction writers
American activists
American newspaper editors
American online publication editors
LGBT Baptist clergy
Editors of Christian publications
Princeton University faculty
Macalester College alumni
Union Theological Seminary (New York City) alumni
1964 births